Kuka is a ghost town in Thomas County, Kansas, United States.

History
Kuka was issued a post office in 1886. The post office was discontinued in 1899.

References

Further reading

External links
 Thomas County maps: Current, Historic, KDOT

Former populated places in Thomas County, Kansas
Former populated places in Kansas